St. Gregorios Orthodox Cathedral, Bangalore is an Orthodox Syrian Christian Cathedral located near Johnson market in Richmond town in Bangalore city, India. It is the only Cathedral for the Orthodox Christian community in Bangalore and known to be one of the oldest Orthodox Churches in the city.

The Church belongs to the Bangalore Diocese of Malankara Orthodox Church, which was founded by St. Thomas, one of the twelve apostles of Jesus Christ, who came to India in A.D. 52.

The cathedral was built around the year 1964. The parish has more than 800 families.

Origins

The cathedral was built around the 1960s when the Orthodox Christian community from Kerala was migrating to Bangalore in high numbers. Earlier, it was a church under the Diocese of Madras Diocese. Around the year 1993, the church was elevated as a  Cathedral by Zachariah Mar Dionysius, Metropolitan of Madras  Diocese. The Cathedral was renovated again in the year 2005.

The Cathedral was instrumental in developing the Bangalore Orthodox Diocese. It was here, the Metropolitan of Bangalore Diocese, Dr. Abraham Mar Seraphim, was officially declared as Metropolitan of Bangalore Diocese with the Sunthronito ceremony (Enthronement) on 27 March 2011 by Baselios Marthoma Paulose II, Catholicos of the East of the Malankara (Indian) Orthodox Church along with three other Bishops. Hence Bangalore diocese was officially declared as a diocese in this cathedral. The cathedral is officially the "Simhasana Pally" of the Bangalore diocesan Metropolitan.

 Fr. Koshy Thomas and Fr. Jacob Thomas are serving as the vicar and asst. vicar of the cathedral respectively. 

The Cathedral has three altars, the left one dedicated to St. Mary and the right one dedicated to St. Thomas. A school under St. Gregorios Cathedral has been functioning in Kengeri.

The Church is located near Johnson Market in Richmond town. A landmark near the cathedral is the Baldwin Methodist college.

Activities

The Cathedral has other wing organizations like Martha Mariam Samajam, Orthodox Christian Youth Movement, MGOCSM and other spiritual organizations. The feast of the cathedral is celebrated in the 1st week of November in the name of St. Gregorios of Parumala and the "Harvest festival" on 2nd week of November. There is a cross tower dedicated to"Parumala Thirumeni" and the holy relics of Parumala Thirumeni are interred here.

External links

Churches in Bangalore
Cathedrals in Karnataka
Malankara Orthodox Syrian church buildings
Churches completed in 1964
20th-century churches in India
20th-century Oriental Orthodox church buildings